Events from the year 1833 in Scotland.

Incumbents

Law officers 
 Lord Advocate – Francis Jeffrey
 Solicitor General for Scotland – Henry Cockburn

Judiciary 
 Lord President of the Court of Session – Lord Granton
 Lord Justice General – The Duke of Montrose
 Lord Justice Clerk – Lord Boyle

Events 
 16 March – at an auction of the art collection of John Clerk, Lord Eldin (died 1832) at his home in Picardy Place, Edinburgh, the floor collapses, killing the banker Alexander Smith.
 April – Glasgow Necropolis opened.
 10 April – St Peter's RC Primary School, Aberdeen, founded.
 28 August –– the Slavery Abolition Act receives Royal Assent, abolishing slavery in most of the British Empire. A £20 million fund is established to compensate slaveowners, many of whom are in Scotland.
 7 October – the Edinburgh Emancipation Society, Edinburgh Ladies' Emancipation Society, Glasgow Emancipation Society and Glasgow Ladies' Emancipation Society are formed in support of abolitionism.
 30 October – Edinburgh Town Council first allows newspaper reporters to attend its meetings.
 Burgh Police (Scotland) Act permits burghs to establish themselves as police burghs, having powers to provide policing and to pave and light streets.
 Glengoyne distillery is established as the Burnfoot distillery by George Connell on the Highland line near Dumgoyne.
 John Menzies is established as a newsagent in Edinburgh.
 Madras College is established in St Andrews by merger of the grammar and English schools under the bequest of locally-born educationalist Rev. Dr. Andrew Bell (died 1832), promoter of the 'Madras system' of education.
 Chemist Thomas Graham proposes Graham's Law.
 Statue of William Pitt the Younger (died 1806) erected in George Street, Edinburgh.
 The Royal Perth Golfing Society gains its royal patronage.

Births 
 1 January – Robert Lawson, architect (died 1902 in New Zealand)
 24 February – William Howie Wylie, journalist and Baptist (died 1891)
 20 March – Daniel Dunglas Home, medium (died 1886 in France)
 16 April – John Malcolm, 1st Baron Malcolm, soldier and politician (died 1902 in France)
 22 April – John Waldie, politician in Ontario (died 1907 in Canada)
 16 July – Donald Reid, landowner, businessman and politician in Otago (died 1919 in New Zealand)
 26 July – Alexander Henry Rhind, antiquarian and Egyptologist (died 1863 in Italy)
 12 August – Aylmer Cameron, soldier, recipient of the Victoria Cross (died 1909 in England)
 12 November – George Paul Chalmers, painter (killed 1878)
 14 December – Alexander Young, mechanical engineer and government official in Hawaii (died 1910 in Honolulu)

Deaths 
 3 May – James Bell, geographical writer (born 1769)
 29 May – William Marshall, fiddle player and composer (born 1748)
 August – Andrew Cochrane-Johnstone, soldier, colonial governor and fraudster (born 1767; died in France)
 10 October – Thomas Atkinson, poet, bookseller and politician  (born c.1801; died at sea)
 11 November – James Grant, naval officer (born 1772; died in France)
 30 November – William Bannatyne, Lord Bannatyne, lawyer and antiquarian (born 1743)

The arts
 May – the final revised edition of The Poetical Works of Sir Walter Scott, Bart, edited by Scott's son-in-law J. G. Lockhart, begins publication.
 Allan Cunningham's poem The Maid of Elvar is published.

See also 

 1833 in the United Kingdom

References 

 
Scotland
1830s in Scotland